2017 Women's Volleyball Thai-Denmark Super League was the 5th edition of the tournament. It was held at the MCC Hall of The Mall Bangkapi in Bangkok, Thailand from 22 – 26 March 2017.

Teams
 Supreme Chonburi
 Bangkok Glass
 Nakhon Ratchasima
 3BB Nakornnont
 Khonkaen Star
 King-Bangkok

Pools composition

Preliminary round

Pool A

|}

|}

Pool B

|}

|}

Final round

Semifinals

|}

Final

|}

Final standing

See also 
 2017 Men's Volleyball Thai-Denmark Super League

References
 

Volleyball,Thai-Denmark Super League
Thai-Denmark Super League
Women's,2017